Contrail was a Japanese video game production company best known for their work on Legend of Legaia and Wild Arms 2.

It was formed on 16 October 1997 as an internal production studio of Sony Computer Entertainment, Inc. with Takahiro Kaneko as head. Between 1998 and 2000, Contrail oversaw the development of several PlayStation titles from external developers until SCEI integrated its operations back into the main company in August 2000.

Games produced

References

External links

PlayStation Studios
Video game development companies
Video game companies established in 1997
Video game companies disestablished in 2000
Defunct video game companies of Japan
Japanese companies established in 1997
Japanese companies disestablished in 2000